Hackberry is an unincorporated community and census-designated place (CDP) in Mohave County, Arizona, United States. Hackberry has a post office which as of 2015 served 68 residential mailboxes with ZIP code 86411. As of the 2020 census, Hackberry had a population of 103.

History
A former mining town, Hackberry takes its name from the Hackberry Mine which was named for a hackberry tree in a nearby spring.

Prospector Jim Music helped develop the Hackberry Silver Mine in 1875. Mining of various metals developed the town, sending it from boom to bust based on fluctuating commodity prices.

The Indianapolis Monroes Iron Clad Age of June 12, 1886, includes a brief article titled "They Changed the Minds of Several", referring to an educated miner from the area:

"J.J. Watts writes from Hackberry, Arizona: 'The books you sent me last year have changed the minds of several to whom I loaned them. It is a pity that liberal books and papers cannot be more generally circulated and read. If they could be we should soon have more outspoken, honest men that would dare to speak their true sentiments.'"

Based on an article taken from the July 24, 1909, edition of the Mohave County Miner out of Kingman, Arizona, J.J. Watts was an old prospector. Here is that article.

"Some time ago the report was current in Kingman that Indians had killed an old prospector, in the Wallapai mountains, first burying the body and later burning up everything of an incriminating nature. The man was supposed to be J. J. Watts, who mined and prospected in the Music mountain range many years. William Grant, the Hackberry merchant, this week received a letter from B.F. Watts, of Marshall, Oklahoma, conveying the information that J.J. Watts died at Lander, Wyoming, last winter. The man who was killed by the Indians is believed to be a stranger that came to Kingman and was lured to the mountains by the Indians by a story of a lost mine that they had found in that section. The man was killed by Willietopsy and his sons, so it is reported by the other Indians."

By 1919, infighting between the mine's owners had become litigation, and the ore was beginning to be depleted. The mine closed; Hackberry briefly almost became a ghost town.

Various service stations in town served U.S. Route 66 travelers after the highway came to town in 1926; all were shut down after Interstate 40 bypassed the town. I-40's  path between Kingman and Seligman diverges widely from the old  Highway 66 segment between these points, leaving Hackberry stranded  from the new highway. Hackberry Road would not even be given an off-ramp. John Grigg operated a Union 76 service station on Route 66 in Hackberry from the 1920s until his death in 1967. The Northside Grocery (established 1934) and its Conoco station were among the last to close, in 1978.

Hackberry almost became a ghost town again, but members of the Grigg family have lived there since the 1890s and continue to live there. Six generations of the Grigg family are buried in the Hackberry cemetery.

In 1992, itinerant artist Bob Waldmire re-opened the Hackberry General Store as a Route 66 tourism information post and souvenir shop on the former Northside Grocery site.

Waldmire sold the store to John and Kerry Pritchard in 1998 due to local disputes regarding the environmental and aesthetic impact of quarries, which by that time were establishing themselves in the area to remove local stone for use in landscaping.

The store remains in operation with a collection of vintage cars from the heyday of U.S. Route 66 in Arizona; in 2008, its owners donated land for a new fire hall to be built for the community.

Geography
Hackberry Road runs south from the town, leading  to U.S. Route 93 south of Interstate 40.

The town sits at the west end of Truxton Canyon, followed by Route 66 as it climbs to the east. Truxton Wash flows northwest into the endorheic Hualapai Valley, ending at Red Lake  from Hackberry.

Education
Most of the community is in the Hackberry School District. A portion of the community is in the Valentine Elementary School District.

Images of Hackberry

Demographics

References

Further reading
  - See clipping from Newspapers.com

See also

 Bullhead City, Arizona
 Fort Mohave, Arizona
 Mohave Valley, Arizona
 Yucca, Arizona
 Santa Claus, Arizona

Census-designated places in Mohave County, Arizona
Census-designated places in Arizona
Unincorporated communities in Mohave County, Arizona
Ghost towns on U.S. Route 66
Unincorporated communities in Arizona